The 1891 Geneva Covenanters football team was an American football team that represented Geneva College as an independent during the 1891 college football season. Led by second-year head coach William McCracken, Geneva compiled a record of 4–2.

Schedule

References

Geneva
Geneva Golden Tornadoes football seasons
Geneva Covenanters football